This is a list of writers on Jainism. The list should include writers who have Wikipedia articles who have written books about Jainism. Each entry should indicate the writers most well-known work. Multiple works should be listed only if each work has a Wikipedia article.

19-20th century 
 A.N. Upadhye
 Champat Rai Jain
 Chandabai
 Chandrashekhar Vijay
 Hampa Nagarajaiah
 Hermann Jacobi
 Jambuvijaya
 Jinendra Varni
 Madhusudan Dhaky
 Nathuram Premi
 Rajendrasuri
 Sukhlal Sanghvi
 Virchand Gandhi

Late 20th century 
 Phoolchandra Shastri
 Colette Caillat
 Bal Patil
 Padmanabh Jaini
 Paul Dundas

21st century 
 Nalini Balbir
 Prabha Kiran Jain
 Mary Whitney Kelting

See also
 List of modern Eastern religions writers

Lists of writers
Writers